Charles Middleton, 2nd Earl of Middleton, Jacobite 1st Earl of Monmouth, PC (1649/1650 – 9 August 1719) was a Scottish and English politician who held several offices under Charles II and James II & VII. He served as Secretary of State for Scotland, the Northern Department and the Southern Department, before acting as Jacobite Secretary of State and chief advisor to James II and then his son James III during their exile in France.

Life
Charles Middleton was born around 1650, the only son of John Middleton, 1st Earl of Middleton, and his first wife Grizel Durham. He had two elder sisters, Helen and Grizel.

Originally from Kincardineshire, in the first part of the 1638 to 1651 Wars of the Three Kingdoms, John Middleton supported the Covenanters, who appointed him commander-in-chief in 1644. After switching sides in 1648, he accompanied Charles II into exile, and Charles grew up in exile, returning home in the 1660 Restoration.

His father died in 1674 leaving him little except for the title and debts; in 1683, Charles married Lady Catherine Brudenell, (1648-1743), daughter of the Catholic Earl of Cardigan. They had four children; John (1683-1746), Katherine (1685-1763), Charles (1688-1738), and Elizabeth (1690-1773).

Middleton was described by Gilbert Burnet as ‘a man of generous temper, but without much religion’; he remained a Protestant until 1701, when he converted to Catholicism at the request of the dying James II.

Career
Middleton is thought to have spent 1669 to 1671 in France and Italy; in 1673, he was commissioned as a captain in the 3rd Foot, later the Buffs, which served in the 1672-1678 Franco-Dutch War as part of the Dutch Scots Brigade. By 1678, he was a Lieutenant-Colonel and governor of Bruges.
  
Shortly after this, he was suggested as Secretary of State for Scotland, in place of the Duke of Lauderdale. This went to Alexander Stuart, 5th Earl of Moray and in June 1680, Middleton was made envoy to Emperor Leopold I.

He returned to Scotland in July 1681, where he became a close associate of James and his wife Mary of Modena. He was appointed to the Scottish Privy Council and made joint Secretary of State for Scotland with Moray on 26 September 1682.

In 1684, he relocated to London and joined the English Privy Council in July and Secretary of State for the Northern Department in August. After James succeeded as king in February 1685, he was elected for Winchelsea and given the task of managing the House of Commons. Parliament was suspended for refusing to repeal the Test Act, while James' reliance on a small circle of Catholics made Middleton suspect as one of the few remaining Protestants.

He was present at the birth of the Prince of Wales in June 1688 and became Secretary of State for the Southern Department in September 1688. When James fled to France after the November 1688 Glorious Revolution, he remained in England; in 1692, he was held in the Tower of London for plotting to restore him and after his release, joined the exiled court at Saint-Germain.

He proposed a more moderate declaration for a Jacobite restoration than James' chief advisor and Secretary of State, John Drummond, 1st Earl of Melfort. He became joint Secretary of State with Melfort, responsible for correspondence with England and Scotland, and became sole Secretary of State after Melfort was dismissed in June 1694. In England, he was tried for treason and outlawed on 23 July 1694, and attainted on 2 July 1695.

He continued as Secretary until James' death in September 1701, when he was appointed to the Regency Council during the minority of his son, James III. Despite his wish to resign, he was persuaded to remain in office and made the Earl of Monmouth in the Jacobite peerage.

With his two sons, Middleton accompanied James in 1708 during the attempted Franco-Jacobite landing in Scotland and allowed to resign as Secretary in 1713. He briefly joined James in Scotland during the 1715 Rising, before returning to France, where he served as Mary's Lord Chamberlain until her death in 1718. Granted a pension by the French government, he died on 9 August 1719 and was buried at the parish church of Saint-Germain.

References

Sources

External links
 

 

Year of birth uncertain
Date of birth unknown
1719 deaths
Buffs (Royal East Kent Regiment) officers
British Secretaries of State
Earls of Middleton
People from Kincardine and Mearns
Members of the Privy Council of Scotland
Members of the Privy Council of England
Monmouth, Charles Middleton, 1st Earl of
Monmouth, Charles Middleton, 1st Earl of
Secretaries of State for the Northern Department
Secretaries of State for the Southern Department
English MPs 1685–1687
Converts to Roman Catholicism
Extraordinary Lords of Session
1650 births